Yuyue or Yue, was an ancient Chinese kingdom during the Spring and Autumn and Warring States periods.

Yuyue or Yu Yue may refer to:

 Zhu Yuyue, Prince of Tang (died 1647), Emperor Shaowu of the Southern Ming Dynasty
 Yelü Xiuge or Yuyue (于越) (died 998), Khitan general from the Liao Dynasty
 Yuyue (鱼跃体), a style of Tibetan calligraphy
 Yuyue (禹越镇), a town in Zhejiang, see List of township-level divisions of Zhejiang
 Yuyue (鱼岳镇), a town in Hubei, see List of township-level divisions of Hubei
 Yu Yue (俞樾) (1821–1907), Chinese scholar during the Qing Dynasty

See also 
 Yueyu
 Yueyue (disambiguation)
 Yuyu (disambiguation)